The Argo Gold Mine and Mill is a former gold mining and milling property in Idaho Springs, Colorado, featuring an intact gold mill built at the entrance of the Argo Tunnel.  The tunnel was built between 1893 and 1910 to drain the gold mines in Virginia Canyon, Gilpin Gulch, Russell Gulch, Quartz Hill, Nevadaville, and Central City and allow easier ore removal.  The success of the tunnel as an access route meant that a large volume of ore began exiting at the Idaho Springs entrance and a large mill was built to process it. At the time it was one of the largest such tunnels and milling operations in the world, directly recovering nearly $100 million in gold (11.2 million ounces) valued in 2023 at $10.1 trillion </ref>"Historic Gold Prices 1833 pres.pdf", accessed 2023-02-25, https://nma.org/wp-content/uploads/2016/09/historic_gold_prices_1833_pres.pdf; and </ref>"Gold Prices- 100 Year Historical Chart", accessed 2023-02-25, https://www.macrotrends.net/1333/historical-gold-prices-100-year-chart. They also sent another $200 million of high-value ores to smelters in Denver.

The property was closed in January 1943 after a major hydraulic accident in the tunnel, and never reopened after a federal moratorium was placed on gold mining during World War II. In 1976 it was purchased by a local investment group led by James N. Maxwell, who wanted to preserve an example of the Colorado gold rush mines. It was renovated and reopened as a tourist attraction and mining museum, and presently continues to offer daily tours.  It was added to the National Register of Historic Places in January 1978.

Present day
The Argo Mill is open all year for tours, weather permitting.  Visitors are provided with a brief history movie, an ore sample and mining equipment demonstration, a tour of the now-reopened tunnel entrance, and a descending tour of the mill structure and extant equipment including gravity separators, amalgamation trays, and froth flotation cells. An indoor museum on the bottom level includes many mining artifacts. An outdoor museum, partly visible from the street, includes larger period equipment used in various stages of extraction, separation, and smelting. A gold panning experience is provided to tour visitors. The outdoor museum and gold panning can also be experienced as a stand-alone attraction.

See also
National Register of Historic Places listings in Clear Creek County, Colorado

References

External links
Historic Argo Tours

Gold mining in Colorado
Mining museums in Colorado
Museums in Clear Creek County, Colorado
Underground mines in the United States
Industrial buildings and structures on the National Register of Historic Places in Colorado
Buildings and structures in Clear Creek County, Colorado
1912 establishments in Colorado
1943 disestablishments in Colorado
Defunct companies based in Colorado
National Register of Historic Places in Clear Creek County, Colorado